This article contains a sortable list of countries by number of broadband Internet subscriptions and penetration rates, using data compiled by the International Telecommunication Union.

List
The list includes figures for both fixed wired broadband subscriptions and mobile cellular subscriptions:

 Fixed-broadband access refers to high-speed fixed (wired) access to the public Internet at downstream speeds equal to, or greater than, 256 kbit/s. This includes satellite Internet access, cable modem, DSL, fibre-to-the-home/building, and other fixed (wired) broadband subscriptions. The totals are measured irrespective of the method of payment. 
 Mobile-cellular access refers to high-speed mobile access to the public Internet at advertised data speeds equal to, or greater than, 256 kbit/s. To be counted, a mobile subscription must allow access to the greater Internet via HTTP and must have been used to make a data connection using the Internet Protocol in the previous three months. SMS and MMS messaging do not count as an active Internet data connection even if they are delivered via IP.

Penetration rate is the percentage (%) of a country's population that are subscribers. A dash (—) is shown when data for 2012 is not available. Non-country and disputed areas are shown in italics. Taiwan is listed as a sovereign country.

Note: Because a single Internet subscription may be shared by many people and a single person my have more than one subscription, the penetration rate will not reflect the actual level of access to broadband Internet of the population and penetration rates larger than 100% are possible.

See also 
 List of countries by number of Internet users
 List of countries by number of telephone lines in use
 List of countries by smartphone penetration
 List of mobile network operators
 List of multiple-system operators
 List of telephone operating companies

References

External links
 "Internet Monitor", a research project of the Berkman Center for Internet & Society at Harvard University to evaluate, describe, and summarize the means, mechanisms, and extent of Internet access, content controls and activity around the world.

International telecommunications
Broadband Internet users
Internet-related lists

IT infrastructure